Araeopteron vilhelmina is a species of moth in the family Erebidae. It is found in North America.

The MONA or Hodges number for Araeopteron vilhelmina is 9081.

References

Further reading

 
 
 

Scolecocampinae
Articles created by Qbugbot
Moths described in 1916